1628 is a Swedish comedy television series. It was first broadcast in 1991. It is set in the year 1628 during the war of Sweden against Poland.

External links
 

Swedish comedy television series
1991 Swedish television series debuts
1991 Swedish television series endings